Holappa is a Finnish surname. Notable people with the surname include:

Mauri Holappa (born 1965), Finnish footballer and coach
Pentti Holappa (1927–2017), Finnish poet, writer, and politician

Finnish-language surnames